Sadsbury Township is the name of some places in the U.S. state of Pennsylvania:

Sadsbury Township, Chester County, Pennsylvania
Sadsbury Township, Crawford County, Pennsylvania
Sadsbury Township, Lancaster County, Pennsylvania

Pennsylvania township disambiguation pages